The Konzerthausorchester Berlin is a German symphony orchestra based in Berlin.  The orchestra is resident at the Konzerthaus Berlin, designed by the architect Karl Friedrich Schinkel.  The building was destroyed during World War II, and was rebuilt from 1979 to 1984.

History
The orchestra was founded in 1952 as the Berliner Sinfonie-Orchester (Berlin Symphony Orchestra) in what was then East Berlin, as a rival ensemble to the Berlin Philharmonic Orchestra based in West Berlin.  The first chief conductor was Hermann Hildebrandt.  In 1974, the Berlin Sinfonietta was founded to serve as the sister chamber orchestra of the Berliner Sinfonie-Orchester.  After German reunification in 1989, the orchestra was threatened with dissolution, but subscriber action maintained the ensemble.  The orchestra acquired its current name in 2006.  (This orchestra is separate from the West-Berlin based Berliner Symphoniker, founded in 1967.)  The Konzerthausorchester Berlin currently has, as its sister chamber orchestra, the Konzerthaus Kammerorchester.

Kurt Sanderling was the longest-serving chief conductor of the orchestra, from 1960 to 1977.  Subsequent chief conductors have been Günther Herbig, Claus Peter Flor, Michael Schønwandt (1992–1998), Eliahu Inbal (2001–2006), Lothar Zagrosek, and Iván Fischer.  In November 2017, the orchestra announced the appointment of Christoph Eschenbach as its next chief conductor, effective with the 2019-2020 season, with an initial contract of 3 years.  In July 2021, the orchestra announced the extension of Eschenbach's contract through the 2022–2023 season.  He is scheduled to conclude his chief conductorship of the orchestra at the close of the 2022-2023 season.

Principal guest conductors of the orchestra have included Dmitri Kitayenko.  With the 2017-2018 season, Juraj Valčuha became principal guest conductor of the orchestra, following his initial guest-conducting appearance with the orchestra in the 2014-2015 season, and his subsequent return guest-conducting engagement 2 years later.

Joana Mallwitz first guest-conducted the orchestra during the 2020-2021 season.  In August 2021, the orchestra announced the appointment of Mallwitz as its next chief conductor and artistic director, effective with the 2023-2024 season, with an initial contract of five seasons.  Mallwitz is the first female conductor to be named chief conductor of the Konzerthausorchester Berlin.

Principal conductors
 Hermann Hildebrandt (1952–1959)
 Kurt Sanderling (1960–1977)
 Günther Herbig (1977–1983)
 Claus Peter Flor (1984–1991)
 Michael Schønwandt (1992–1998)
 Eliahu Inbal (2001–2006)
 Lothar Zagrosek (2006–2011)
 Iván Fischer (2012–2018)
 Christoph Eschenbach (2019–present)
 Joana Mallwitz (designate, effective 2023)

See also
 Music in Berlin

References

External links
 Official website of the Konzerthausorchester Berlin 

Musical groups established in 1952
German orchestras
Music in Berlin
1952 establishments in Germany